Dalmores is a surname. Notable people with the surname include:

 Aimée Dalmores (1890–1920), Italian-born American actress
 Charles Dalmorès (1871–1939), French tenor